German submarine U-1022 was a Type VIIC/41 U-boat of Nazi Germany's Kriegsmarine. She was laid down on 6 May 1943 by Blohm & Voss in Hamburg, Germany, and commissioned on 7 June 1944, the day after the Allied landings in Normandy, with Kapitänleutnant Hans-Joachim Ernst in command. After the war she was handed over to the Allies and sunk in Operation Deadlight.

Construction and design

German Type VIIC/41 submarines were preceded by the heavier Type VIIC submarines. U-1022 had a displacement of  when at the surface and  while submerged. She had two shafts and two  propellers.

U-1022 was fitted with five  torpedo tubes (four fitted at the bow and one at the stern), fourteen torpedoes, one  SK C/35 naval gun, (220 rounds), one  Flak M42 and two  C/30 anti-aircraft guns. The boat had a complement of between forty-four and sixty.

Service history
U-1022 was ordered by the Kriegsmarine on 13 June 1942. She was laid down less than one year later at Blohm & Voss, Hamburg on 6 May 1943 . U-1022 was launched from Hamburg on 13 April 1944. She was formally commissioned later that year on 7 June 1944, the day after the Allied landings at Normandy.  After her training (during which she travelled from Germany to Norway), U-1022 left her home port of Bergen, Norway on her first and only patrol. During this patrol, which lasted 49 days, U-1022 traveled from Norway to the southern coast of Iceland. In this time span she managed to sink two enemy vessels, the Panamanian steam merchant Alcedo for a loss of 1,392 GRT and the British vessel,  for a loss of 328 GRT. U-1022 arrived back in Bergen on 1 April 1945 and remained in port for the remainder of the war. Following Germany's defeat in the war, U-1022 along with most of the remaining German submarine fleet were sunk in Operation Deadlight.

Summary of raiding history

See also
 Battle of the Atlantic (1939-1945)

References

Bibliography

External links

German Type VIIC/41 submarines
U-boats commissioned in 1944
World War II submarines of Germany
1944 ships
Operation Deadlight
Ships built in Hamburg
U-boats sunk in 1945
Maritime incidents in December 1945